Zawyat Razin, formerly Shubra al-Laun, known in Antiquity as Nikiû, Nikiou or Nikious, is a city in the Monufia Governorate, Egypt. The alternative name of the city was Prosopis.

The region hosted the famous Fort Nikiou which was built by Emperor Trajan. The city witnessed the Battle of Nikiou between the Rashidun Caliphate and Byzantine Empire in May of 646.

Notable people
 John of Nikiû, an Egyptian Coptic bishop
 Aristomachus, a Byzantine official

References

Populated places in Monufia Governorate